Stanisław Brzozowski may refer to:

 Stanisław Brzozowski (writer) (1878–1911), Polish writer

 Stanisław Korab-Brzozowski (1876–1901), Polish poet
 Stanisław Brzozowski (mime artist) (born 1938), Polish mime artist